Belek Ghazi (Nuruddevle Belek or Balak) was a Turkish bey in the early 12th century.

Early life
His father was Behram and his grandfather was Artuk Bey, an important figure of the Seljuk Empire in the 11th century. He was a short-term governor of Suruç (now a district center in Şanlıurfa Province of Turkey). The city was captured during the First Crusade in 1098. He took part in the Seljuk expedition to Antakya which was recently lost to Crusaders. But the campaign ended in failure.

Beylik in Harput
In 1112, Belek captured Harput (an ancient city near to present day Elazığ in Turkey) from Mengüceks. He founded a beylik. This beylik is now known as the Harput branch of the Artukids (the other two being the Hasankeyf branch of Sökmen and Mardin branch of Ilghazi). Next year he married Ayşe Hatun, widow of Anatolian Seljuk sultan Kilij Arslan. By this prestigious marriage, he formed family ties with the Seljuk family.
	
In 1120, Belek together with Danishmends defeated a coalition of Mengüceks and Constantine Gabras of the Byzantine Empire. Two years later, after the death of Ilghazi, Belek became the leader of the Artukids. In 1122, he defeated the forces of the County of Edessa and took Joscelin I as captive. The next year, Baldwin II of Jerusalem too was captured by Belek. These two victories gained Belek fame both in Muslim countries and in Europe. From 1123 to 1124, Belek served as emir of Aleppo.

Death and aftermath
In 1124, he was invited to defend Tyre, the only port the Muslims used in Syria against the attacking Crusaders. In the meantime, Belek was besieging Manbij, after he imprisoned its emir Hassan al-Ba'labakki ibn Gümüshtigin who pledged allegiance to Joscelin I, in which he managed to capture the city but the castle was still controlled by the defenders led by Hassan's brother Isa. A Crusader force led by Joscelin I tried to help the defenders, but Belek forced them to retreat to Turbessel (nowTilbaşar), and maintained the siege until he was hit and killed by an arrow on 6 May 1124. His cousin Husam al-Din Timurtash ibn Ilghazi took his dead body back to Aleppo on the next day. Shortly after his death Harput was annexed by the Artukids of Hasankeyf. Nevertheless, in 1185 another beylik was founded by Artukids in Harput.

Notes

References

Sources

Bibliography
 
 
 

Government officials of the Seljuk Empire
Turkic rulers
11th-century births
1124 deaths
History of Elazığ Province
Artuqids
People of the Nizari–Seljuk wars